The 2015–16 North Dakota State Bison men's basketball team represented North Dakota State University in the 2015–16 NCAA Division I men's basketball season. The Bison, led by second year head coach David Richman, played their home games at the Scheels Arena, due to renovations at the Bison Sports Arena, and were members of The Summit League. They finished the season 20–13, 8–8 in Summit League play to finish in fifth place. They defeated IUPUI and IPFW to advance to the championship game of The Summit League tournament where they lost to South Dakota State. Despite having 20 wins, they did not participate in a postseason tournament.

Roster

Schedule

|-
!colspan=9 style="background:#008000; color:#FFFF00;"| Exhibition

|-
!colspan=9 style="background:#008000; color:#FFFF00;"| Non-conference regular season

|-
!colspan=9 style="background:#008000; color:#FFFF00;"| Summit League regular season

|-
!colspan=9 style="background:#008000; color:#FFFF00;"| The Summit League tournament

References

North Dakota State Bison men's basketball seasons
North Dakota State
Bison
Bison